Bombeeta is a rural locality in the Cassowary Coast Region, Queensland, Australia.

History 
Bombeeta State School opened on 7 March 1922. It closed in 1939. It was located at the Eight Mile Siding on the Japoon Tramline via Innisfail.

Education 
There are no schools in Bombeeta. The nearest primary school is Mena Creek State School in neighbouring Mena Creek to the north. The nearest government secondary school is Innisfail State College in Innisfail Estate to the north-east.

References 

Cassowary Coast Region
Localities in Queensland